Hampshire County is a county in the U.S. state of West Virginia. As of the 2020 census, the population was 23,093. Its county seat is Romney, West Virginia's oldest town (1762). The county was created by the Virginia General Assembly in 1754, from parts of Frederick and Augusta Counties (Virginia) and is the state's oldest county. The county lies in both West Virginia's Eastern Panhandle and Potomac Highlands regions.

Hampshire County is part of the Winchester, VA-WV Metropolitan Statistical Area.

Name

Although its creation was authorized in 1754, Hampshire County was not actually organized until 1757 because the area was not considered safe due to the outbreak of the French and Indian War (1754–1763). According to Samuel Kercheval's A History of the Valley of Virginia (1833), the county was named in honor of its several prize hogs. The story goes that Thomas Fairfax, 6th Lord Fairfax of Cameron (1693–1781), who owned the Royal Grant to the area, came upon some very large hogs in Winchester and asked where they had been raised. He was told that they were from the South Branch Potomac River Valley (now Hampshire County). He remarked that when a county was formed west of Frederick that he would name it in honor of the county Hampshire, England, famous for its very fat hogs.

History

Earliest European settlers
Romney was initially settled by hunters and traders around 1725. In 1738, John Pearsall (or Pearsoll) and his brother Job built homes and in 1758 a fort (Fort Pearsall) for defense against Native Americans in present-day Romney. Their settlement was then known as Pearsall's Flats. In 1748, Thomas Fairfax, 6th Lord Fairfax of Cameron sent a surveying party, including 16-year-old George Washington, to survey his lands along the Potomac and South Branch Potomac rivers. Washington spent three summers and falls surveying Lord Fairfax's Northern Neck estate, which included all of the present-day Eastern Panhandle of West Virginia. Oral traditions claimed that Washington laid present-day Romney out into lots at that time, but written records from that era indicate that Romney was surveyed and laid out into lots by James Genn prior to Washington's arrival. Genn was also employed by Lord Fairfax.

18th century Hampshire County
In 1756, Fort Pearsall was constructed on Job Pearsall's plantation for protection against Native American raids and George Washington provisioned and garrisoned the Fort at various times until 1758. At that time, there were at least 100 people living in the general area. Following the end of hostilities in the area, Lord Fairfax recognized that more settlers would be interested in moving into the area and that he could earn some extra revenue by selling plots in the town. He sent a survey party to Romney in 1762 to formally lay out the town into 100 lots. At that time, he renamed the town Romney, in honor of the Cinque Ports city on the English Channel in Kent.

Confusion ensued for several decades concerning land ownership within the town, as counterclaims were made by the original settlers, and those who purchased lots laid out by Lord Fairfax's surveyors.

The first meeting of the Hampshire County Court was held in 1757, at Fort Pleasant, now Old Fields in Hardy County, and was presided by the Right Honorable Thomas Bryan Martin, Lord Fairfax's nephew. By that time, Hampshire County's population had fallen dramatically as most of the settlers had fled the county in fear of the Native Americans. The only families remaining lived near Fort Pearsall, near present-day Romney, and Fort Edwards, at present-day Capon Bridge on the Cacapon River. The vast majority of the remaining settlers, however, were in the vicinity of present Old Fields-Moorefield-Petersburg and were protected by the several forts in the area, including Fort Pleasant

Once the Native Americans were defeated at the Battle of Point Pleasant in 1774 settlers, once again, returned to the county. Additionally, with the end of the American Revolution, the Virginia Legislature nullified the English grant to Lord Fairfax in the region. The legislature gave fee simple grants to settlers who already had contracts with Lord Fairfax, and opened up the remaining lands as public domain open to settlement. By 1790, when the first national census was taken, Hampshire County had 7,346 residents, making it the second most populous county in the present state of West Virginia at that time. Berkeley was the most populous county, with 19,713 people. There were nine counties that comprised the present state, with a total population of 55,873 people.

During the Whiskey Rebellion in 1794, many Hampshire County men volunteered to serve under Major General Daniel Morgan to put down the insurrection. The men most likely volunteered at Moorefield in Hardy County and then marched north to Cumberland, Maryland. Approximately 1,200 of the 12,950 men under Morgan's command came from the area that would later become West Virginia.

Early churches

Many early settlers of the Cacapon area were German Baptist Brethren (or Dunkers), pacifist farmers who often befriended local natives in frontier areas.
Other early missionaries helped to sustain the religious faith of the early European inhabitants. In 1775 two Baptist missionaries among a group of settlers moved to the Cacapon and organized the first European church in the county. In 1771 the work of the Methodist Episcopal Church was begun, in which later developments led to the formation of the Methodist Episcopal Church, South. In 1753 Hampshire County had been formed into a parish by the Protestant Episcopal Church and from 1772 until his death in 1777 Rev. Nathaniel Manning served on the Glebe near present-day Moorefield. In 1787 a Primitive Baptist church was established at North River. Soon after the American Revolution there was preaching by the Presbyterians at different points in the county. In 1792 a Presbyterian church was organized at Romney and another, Mount Bethel Church, at Three Churches.

Early industry

The wide lowlands of Hampshire County certainly invited agriculture, and fields of wheat and tobacco surrounded the important truck-patch of the settler. The rolling uplands offered pasturage for horses, cattle, sheep, and hogs, which were driven across country to market at Winchester. The streams abounded in fish and the mountains contained not only game but timber and stone for early settlers' homes. The limestone was burned for lime at Bloomery Gap, where remains of old lime-kilns give evidence of an early industry. Soon it was discovered that some of the strata contained iron ore. Much of it was transported to present-day Keyser, from an area along South Branch Potomac River south of the present limits of the county. In Bloomery Gap, a ruined furnace still stands, mute evidence of another former industry. In the early days the increasing population stimulated not only farming and grazing but every industry of a new country. Hampshire County was also known for its many gunmakers, located on or near the main road from Winchester to Romney. Among them were, Henry Topper, Jacob Kline, George Young, Benjamin Shane, George Glaze, William Britton and the Sheetz Family.

19th century Hampshire County

The building of the Northwestern Turnpike (U.S. Route 50) was an integral part of the development of Hampshire County. General Daniel Morgan first suggested the road be built in 1748, but his recommendations were not acted upon until the 1830s. Colonel Claudius Crozet, a Frenchman who had previously worked for Napoleon Bonaparte, engineered the road which connected Parkersburg with Winchester, Virginia. The turnpike traversed Hampshire County stretching through the communities of Capon Bridge, Loom, Hanging Rock, Pleasant Dale, Augusta, Frenchburg, Shanks, and Romney. Through the years, Romney became an important rest stop for travelers on the turnpike. This aided the local economy as hotels and taverns began to appear in the area.

During the American Civil War, the Hampshire Guards and Frontier Riflemen joined the Confederate Army. Although there were no major battles in Hampshire County, Romney changed hands at least fifty-six times during the war. It was often a case of one army evacuating the area allowing the opposing army to move into the town. This places Romney second behind Winchester as the town that changed hands the most during the American Civil War. On June 11, 1861, it changed hands twice in the same day. Some local Hampshire County historians speculate that Romney actually changed hands more than Winchester, but there are no surviving records to support the claim.

In 1863, West Virginia's counties were divided into civil townships, with the intention of encouraging local government.  This proved impractical in the heavily rural state, and in 1872 the townships were converted into magisterial districts.  Between 1866, when Mineral County was formed from the western portion of Hampshire County, and 1871, when part of southern Mineral County was returned to Hampshire, the county was divided into six townships: Bloomery, Capon, Gore, Romney, Sherman, and Springfield.  These became magisterial districts in 1872, and a seventh district, Mill Creek, was formed in part from the land that had been in Mineral County from 1866 to 1871.

Geography

Major highways
 U.S. Route 50
 U.S. Route 220
 West Virginia Route 9
 West Virginia Route 28
 West Virginia Route 29
 West Virginia Route 127
 West Virginia Route 259

Adjacent counties

Allegany County, Maryland (north)
Morgan County (northeast)
Frederick County, Virginia (east)
Hardy County (south)
Mineral County (west)

Rivers and streams

Potomac River
Cacapon River
Capon Springs Run
Dillons Run
Edwards Run
Mill Branch
North River
Grassy Lick Run
Tearcoat Creek
Bearwallow Creek
Little Cacapon River
North Fork Little Cacapon River
South Fork Little Cacapon River
North Branch Potomac River
Green Spring Run
South Branch Potomac River
Big Run
Buffalo Creek
Mill Creek
Mill Run

Mountains

South Branch Mountain, 
Pinnacle Ridge, 
Nathaniel Mountain, 
Mill Creek Mountain, 
Cacapon Mountain, 
Spring Mountain, 
Spring Gap Mountain, 
North River Mountain, 
Cooper Mountain, 
Baker Mountain, 
Patterson Creek Mountain, 
Sideling Hill, 
Little Cacapon Mountain, 
Ice Mountain, 
The Devil's Nose,

Other geological formations
Caudy's Castle
Hanging Rocks
Mechanicsburg Gap
The Trough

Demographics

2000 census
As of the census of 2000, there were 20,203 people, 7,955 households, and 5,640 families residing in the county. There were 11,185 housing units at an average density of 17 per square mile (7/km2). The racial makeup of the county was 98.04% White, 0.83% Black or African American, 0.24% Native American, 0.16% Asian, 0.02% Pacific Islander, 0.12% from other races, and 0.59% from two or more races. 0.55% of the population were Hispanic or Latino of any race.

There were 7,955 households, out of which 31.30% had children under the age of 18 living with them, 56.70% were married couples living together, 9.50% had a female householder with no husband present, and 29.10% were non-families. 24.60% of all households were made up of individuals, and 10.60% had someone living alone who was 65 years of age or older. The average household size was 2.49 and the average family size was 2.94.

In the county, the population was spread out, with 25.10% under the age of 18, 7.10% from 18 to 24, 27.60% from 25 to 44, 25.60% from 45 to 64, and 14.60% who were 65 years of age or older. The median age was 38 years. For every 100 females, there were 99.70 males. For every 100 females age 18 and over, there were 97.30 males.

The median income for a household in the county was $31,666, and the median income for a family was $37,616. Males had a median income of $28,884 versus $19,945 for females. The per capita income for the county was $14,851. About 12.90% of families and 16.30% of the population were below the poverty line, including 22.70% of those under age 18 and 13.10% of those age 65 or over.

2010 census
As of the 2010 United States census, there were 23,964 people, 9,595 households, and 6,606 families residing in the county. The racial makeup of the county was 97.2% white, 1.0% black or African American, 0.2% Asian, 0.2% American Indian, 0.1% Pacific islander, 0.2% from other races, and 1.1% from two or more races. Those of Hispanic or Latino origin made up 1.0% of the population. In terms of ancestry, 29.0% were German, 12.9% were American, 11.9% were Irish, and 8.0% were English.

Of the 9,595 households, 29.9% had children under the age of 18 living with them, 54.3% were married couples living together, 9.1% had a female householder with no husband present, 31.2% were non-families, and 25.8% of all households were made up of individuals. The average household size was 2.44 and the average family size was 2.91. The median age was 42.6 years.

The median income for a household in the county was $31,792 and the median income for a family was $45,447. Males had a median income of $36,828 versus $25,347 for females. The per capita income for the county was $17,752. About 11.0% of families and 16.4% of the population were below the poverty line, including 20.1% of those under age 18 and 18.2% of those age 65 or over.

Politics
During the Virginia Secession Convention, Hampshire County voted against secession, but much of this vote was within what is now part of heavily Unionist and Republican Mineral County, which was detached from it after the war. Following the detachment of Mineral – which was not to give a Democratic majority before 1936 or after 1976 – Hampshire County became solidly Democratic, not voting for any Republican candidate between 1868 and 1952 inclusive. However, since 1968 Hampshire County has not voted for any Democratic presidential candidate apart from Jimmy Carter in 1976, and since 2000 it has suffered the same drastic declines in Democratic support as the rest of socially conservative West Virginia. Donald Trump won the county by an overwhelming margin in 2016.

Education

Public schools
Hampshire County Schools
West Virginia Schools for the Deaf and Blind

Private schools
Maranatha Christian Academy
Slanesville Christian School

Parks and recreation

County parks
Central Hampshire Park, Augusta
Green Spring Recreational Park, Green Spring
Hampshire Park & 4-H Camp, Romney
Romney Recreation Center, Romney
Shanks Roadside Park, Shanks

Wildlife management areas

Edwards Run Wildlife Management Area
Fort Mill Ridge Wildlife Management Area
Nathaniel Mountain Wildlife Management Area
Short Mountain Wildlife Management Area
South Branch Wildlife Management Area
Wardensville Wildlife Management Area

National forests
George Washington National Forest

Communities

City
Romney

Town
Capon Bridge

Magisterial districts
Bloomery
Capon
Gore
Mill Creek
Romney
Sherman
Springfield

Census-designated places
Green Spring
Springfield

Unincorporated communities

Augusta
Barnes Mill
Bloomery
Blues Beach
Bubbling Spring
Capon Lake
Capon Springs
Capon Springs Station
Cold Stream
Concord
Creekvale
Davis Ford
Delray
Dillons Run
Donaldson
Forks of Cacapon
Frenchburg
Glebe
Good
Grace
Hainesville
Hanging Rock
Higginsville
High View
Hooks Mills
Hoy
Intermont
Jericho
Junction
Kirby
Largent
Lehew
Levels
Little Cacapon
Loom
Mechanicsburg
Millbrook
Millen
Neals Run
Nero
North River Mills
Okonoko
Pancake
Pin Oak
Pleasant Dale
Points
Purgitsville
Rada
Raven Rocks
Ridgedale
Rio
Ruckman
Sector
Sedan
Shanks
Shiloh
Slanesville
South Branch Depot
Three Churches
Valley
Vance
Vanderlip
Wappocomo
Woodrow
Yellow Spring

Notable people

See also
Edwards Run Wildlife Management Area
Fort Mill Ridge Wildlife Management Area
List of historical highway markers in Hampshire County, West Virginia
List of placenames in Hampshire County, West Virginia
Short Mountain Wildlife Management Area
South Branch Wildlife Management Area
USS Hampshire County (LST-819)
National Register of Historic Places listings in Hampshire County, West Virginia

Footnotes

References

Bibliography

External links

Official Hampshire County website
Historic Hampshire homepage
Hampshire Review newspaper

 
Northwestern Turnpike
West Virginia counties on the Potomac River
1754 establishments in Virginia
Populated places established in 1754
Counties of Appalachia
Winchester, VA–WV MSA